In May 2018, Matthew Hedges, a British doctoral student who was in the United Arab Emirates for a two-week research trip, was arrested at Dubai International Airport on suspicion of spying on behalf of the British government. In November 2018, Hedges was sentenced to life imprisonment in the United Arab Emirates on charges of espionage in state security.

The verdict was criticised in the United Kingdom, including by Prime Minister Theresa May and Secretary of State for Foreign and Commonwealth Affairs Jeremy Hunt. Hedges was pardoned in November 2018, ahead of the UAE's National Day.

Biography
Hedges was born in Surrey, England, and attended Cranleigh School. He works for a British cyber intelligence company. He earned a bachelor's degree from the University of Bradford. He has an MA from the University of Exeter, for the thesis "What has driven the UAE's military spending since 2001?". In 2015, he began a PhD program at Durham University's School of Government and International Affairs examining the effects of the Arab Spring on the Gulf states. He met his wife Daniela Tejada while at the University of Exeter.

Hedges had previously worked for a security and political consultancy firm in the UAE. Since January 2016 he has been an advisor for the U.S. geopolitical risk consulting firm Gulf State Analytics.

In March 2018, Hedges wrote an article for the Middle East Policy Council on the future of the Muslim Brotherhood and the Gulf Cooperation Council, and in April 2018 an article about the modernisation of the Royal Saudi Navy for Gulf State Analytics.

As of July 2021, Hedges was continuing his doctoral studies at Durham. As of January 2023, his studies have been completed.

Arrest and imprisonment

In April 2018, Hedges travelled to the United Arab Emirates (UAE) as part of a research trip for his PhD. He was conducting interviews for his thesis. At the end of his two-week visit, Hedges was arrested at Dubai International Airport on suspicion of spying on behalf of the British government. He was held for almost six months, mostly in solitary confinement.

According to his wife, in the first month of being detained, Hedges slept on the floor and had no access to a shower. The Emirates News Agency said that Hedges had access to medical care and that his detainment was compliant with Emirati law. According to Tejada, Hedges suffered from panic attacks while in jail. Hedges was only able to speak to his wife once a week.

In October 2018, a local report said that a foreign national, believed to be Hedges, had been accused of "seeking confidential information about the UAE", and said that the suspect had confessed to the charges. In the same month, Hedges was released on bail prior to the trial. In November 2018, Abu Dhabi court sentenced Hedges to life imprisonment in the UAE on charges of spying and providing confidential information to outside sources.

According to The National newspaper, a life sentence in the UAE consists of a maximum of 25 years in jail, followed by deportation for non-Emiratis. In accordance with Emirati law, Hedges was given 30 days to appeal the court ruling. According to Sulaiman Hamid al-Mazroui, the UAE ambassador to the United Kingdom, Hedges' family pleaded for a pardon.

Reactions
British Prime Minister Theresa May called the verdict "disappointing". British Secretary of State for Foreign and Commonwealth Affairs Jeremy Hunt criticized the verdict, claiming that it had been done in a five-minute hearing, an allegation denied by Sulaiman Hamid al-Mazroui. Non-governmental organisation Human Rights Watch said that the trial "was marred with such due process violations that there’s no way it could have been seen as a fair trial". Alex Younger, the head of MI6, said that he "couldn't understand how our Emirati partners came to the conclusions they came to."

After the verdict, the University of Birmingham voted to boycott its new campus in Dubai, in protest of the decision. Staff at Exeter University, where Hedges was previously an undergraduate, passed a motion calling for the suspension of its academic relationships with the UAE. Tejada set up an online petition which attracted over 200,000 signatures.

Pardon and release
On 26 November 2018, Hedges was pardoned by UAE President Khalifa bin Zayed Al Nahyan, as part of the UAE tradition of pardoning people on the country's National Day.

After his release, Hedges went to the British embassy in Abu Dhabi, from where he later travelled back to the United Kingdom. He arrived at Heathrow Airport on the morning of Tuesday, 27 November 2018, where he was reunited with his wife, whom he praised for having tirelessly campaigned for his release. In December 2018, Hedges said that he was speaking to a specialist psychiatrist about the effects of his imprisonment.

Complaints
In May 2019, Hedges' lawyer lodged a complaint against the Foreign and Commonwealth Office alleging it failed in its duty of care to negotiate Hedges' release. Hedges and his wife are also requesting an independent inquiry. In May 2021, Hedges launched legal action against senior Emirati officials in relation to his alleged torture.

Publications
Hedges, M.J. & Cafiero, G. (2017). "The GCC and the Muslim Brotherhood: What Does the Future Hold?" Middle East Policy 24(1): 129–153.

References

British people imprisoned abroad
Prisoners and detainees of the United Arab Emirates